Ntokozo Mdluli (born 13 October 1980), known professionally as K.O, is a South African rapper. He began his career as  a member of Teargas, a hip hop group which released its debut album titled K'shubile K'bovu (2006), followed by Wafa Wafa (2008), Dark or Blue (2009) and last album Num8er Num8er (2012).

Following Teargas departure, K.O pursued his  solo career and released his solo debut album Skhanda Republic (2014), debuted at #1 in South Africa and was certified platinum Recording Industry of South Africa (RiSA).

K.O's second studio album Skhanda Republic 2 (2017), released in partnership with Sony Music Entertainment Africa.

Early life 
K.O was born Ntokozo Mdluli in Piet Retief, Mpumalanga in 1980. He is the son of Thembisile Mdluli and Jabulani Mdluli. He completed his matric and went to Vaal University of Technology where he studied a National Diploma in Public Relations Management.

While at Vaal University of Technology, Mdluli met his would be bandmates, brothers; Ezee "Ma-E" Hanabe and Bantu "Ntukza" Hanabe. He completed his studies and graduated with a Public Relations (PR) Management National Diploma from Vaal University of Technology. Initially he struggled to find employment, according to a Sowetan article he spent two years unemployed before his mother sent his CV to the South African Police Service but he never followed up. "I was trying to make demos with funding from my parents and they believed in my dream but I eventually started giving up. My mother sent my CV to the SAPS but I didn't go for the interview. The day of the interview I knew I was struggling but I couldn't go through with it," K.O was quoted in the Sowetan. He went on to work in the field of his studies with a dream of becoming a musician.

Music career

2005–2009: Teargas 
In 2005, while employed in the Public Relations, K.O and brothers from Soweto; Ma-E and Ntukza, they decided to form a Hip Hop group called Teargas. "We realised it would be better to join since we were already good friends who knew each other's rhyming style", K.O was quoted by the City Press. In 2006 Teargas released their debut album, K'shubile K'bovu, the album was a smash hit and a runaway success. The fifteen (15) track album featured a timeless smash hit titled "chance". "Chance", a Hip Hop song chronicling a life of a township gangster seeking redemption, was reminiscent of the early days of Kwaito. In 2008 Teargas released their second studio album titled Wafa Wafa; in the sixteen (16) track album the group worked with Bongo Riot on two songs, "Champions" and "Sunshine".

In 2009, they released their third studio album titled Dark or Blue, in the thirteen (13) track album Teargas collaborated with Tamarsha on the song titled "Life", with DJ Tira and Liesl Penniken on the song called "Party 101", with Hip Hop Pantsula and Pro (formerly Pro Kid) on the song "Goodfellaz" and with Danny K on the song "T.L.C. (Tender, Love and Care)". In 2012 Teargas released their fourth and final studio album called Number Number (stylized Num8er Num8er); in the fifteen (15) track album they worked with 2Face "Turning Tables", Lilly Million on "Forgive Me", Toya Delazy on "Paradise" and Ziyon on "Put U On".

2013–15: Skhanda Republic

Cashtime Life 

In 2013, K.O joined forces with Teargas bandmate, Ma-E, and music and marketing executive Thabiso Khati to form an entertainment company, Cashtime Life, which he (K.O) became its first artist. This was followed by the release of the first official single of K.O's first solo album, Mission Statement, which became a critical success and enjoyed massive airplay across South Africa.

In 2014, K.O was featured on AKA's hit single, "Run Jozi (Godly)". The verse by K.O would go down as one of the greatest verses in SA Hip Hop.

In March 2014, he released a second official single from his first album, "Caracara", and it went on to an even bigger success, reaching one million views on YouTube and break the record for most views of a South African hip-hop video. "Caracara" would then become the first SA hip hop song to win record of the year at the annual South African Music Awards(SAMA). 
"Caracara" was also nominated for Best Hit Single, Best Collaboration and Best Music Video at the 14th Annual Metro FM Awards.

K.O later released, "Son of a Gun", a third official single for his first album titled Skhanda Republic.

In November 2014, K.O's first solo album, Skhanda Republic, was released. In the 11 track album, K.O collaborated with Kid X on "Caracara", Nandi Mngoma on "Skhanda Love" and Ma-E, Maggz and Masandi on "One Time". Skhanda Republic would go on to win 3 SAMA awards including the Rap Album of the year. Skhanda Republic was also nominated for Best Hip Hop album and Best Male Album at the 14th Annual Metro FM Awards.

K.O also won the MTV Base MC of the year panel decided crown for the year in 2014.

2016–19: SR2,  PTY UnLTD 
In July 2017, Ntokozo signed a partnership & distribution with Sony Entertainment.
He announced  a single and his new album coming up later same year. He released his a single  "No Feelings" on 21 July, song production was handled by Hylton Brooker & Gemini Major. The song was certified platinum (RiSA) with sales of 25 000 copies.
His single "Don Dada" featuring Okmalumkoolkat on 14 October.

Ntokozo went to drop his second sophomore album Skhanda Republic 2  stylized as SR2, in October  2017. In March 2019, his single "Supa Dupa" was released as album's lead single. The song was certified 2× gold (RiSA) with sales of 20 000 copies. "Say U Will" was released as the second single.  He went on to follow-up with his third solo album titled PTY UnLTD, in the year 2019.

"Supa Dupa", is the only South African hip hop song to receive a gold plaque in the year 2019.

2021–present: Skhanda Republic 3 
In September 2021, he announced his upcoming fourth album Skhanda Republic 3, and released "Playback" on October 15, 2021.

The second single "Emoyeni" was released on March 25, 2022. The latter is followed up by a freestyle titled, "SKHANDAVILLE FREESTYLE" on July 25, 2022 as a first single to the upcoming album and as a follow up to the "No Fear (Freestyle)".

In August 2022 K.O released his biggest hit yet after Cara Cara which features Young Stunna and Blxckie named "SETE", was released and is on the third installment of Skhanda Republic. The single has already been certified double platinum by RISA and is marked as the fastest gold single in SA streaming history. The music video was released on the first of September. The latter was certified platinum status in 16 days by RISA. 

On 20 August 2022 rapper Big Zulu released a diss track aimed at K.O and other renowned South African rappers. A diss track response was dropped on 22 August by K.O, titled "Omega" after releasing Sete on the 19th.

The tracklist and art cover to the album was unveiled on Instagram including the names of the features. Sjava, Msaki, Zuma, Pabi Cooper and Sarkodie will be featured on this album. It will have 14 songs and the tracks "Playback" and "Emoyeni", have not been listed in the tracklist.

The album debuted at number one on Spotify Weekly Top Albums SA Chart. It became the first album by a South African hip hop artist to debut at number one on the list.

On the 2 February 2023, K.O announced the release of a song which was released later on that day. The track takes shots at amapiano artist, Lady Du who predicted that Sete would not get certified gold, which evidently platinum and almost diamond. Drama with former band mate Ntukza was also mentioned. The Sete hitmaker addressed the fact that there would not be any reunion of Teargas. Despite SETE being song of the year on many music platforms Ukhozi FM never awarded it and that matter was unveiled in the song.

Teargas 
In an interview with the Sunday World K.O dismissed claims that Teargas has split. "We have decided to individually try new things just like Mafikizolo did. We are taking a break but it does not mean we are a dead group," K.O was quoted in that interview.

Personal life 
In May 2014, K.O lost a significant amount of weight. Social media rumours appeared that K.O was HIV positive. His manager Thabiso Khati denied those rumours, stating that K.O had undergone a strict diet plan and was exercising regularly. K.O later released a statement regarding his health and posted a picture of his blood test results on his Twitter and Instagram page, showing he was HIV negative.

Awards and nominations

Channel O Africa Music Video Awards 

!Ref
|-
|rowspan="5"|2014
|rowspan="5"|"Caracara"
|Most Gifted Male
|
|
|-
|Most Gifted Duo/Group or Featuring Artist
|
|
|-
|Most Gifted Hip Hop
|
|
|-
|Most Gifted Southern Artist
|
|
|-
|Most Gifted Video of the Year
|
|
|-

South African Music Awards 

|-
-
|rowspan="3"|2015
|rowspan="3"|"Skhanda Republic"
|Record of The Year ("Caracara")
|
|-
|Rap Album of The Year
|
|-
|Best Collaboration ("Caracara" ft Kid X)
|
|-
|rowspan="3"|2020
|rowspan="3"|"PtyUnltd"
|Record of The Year ("Supa Dupa")
|
|-
|Rap Album of The Year
|
|-
|Best Collaboration ("Say You Will ft Nandi Madida")
|
|-
|2021
|"Lucky Star"
|Best Produced Music Video
|

South African Hip Hop Awards 

!
|-
|rowspan=3|2022
|rowspan=3|SETE
|Best Video 
|
|rowspan=3|
|-
|Best  Collaboration 
|
|-
|Song of the Year 
|

Discography

Studio albums 
 Skhanda Republic (2014)
 Skhanda Republic 2 (2017)
 PTY UnLTD (2019)
 Skhanda Republic 3 (2022)

Extended plays 
2Piece (2018)

As member of Teargas 
 K'shubile K'bovu (2006)
 Wafa Wafa (2008)
 Dark or Blue (2009)
 Num8er Num8er (2012)

As lead artist

References 

Living people
People from Soweto
South African rappers
South African record producers
1989 births